Apha aequalis is a moth in the family Eupterotidae. It was described by Felder in 1874. It is found in Japan.

The wingspan is 45–59 mm.

The larvae feed on a wide range of plants, including Lonicera japonica.

References

Moths described in 1874
Eupterotinae